Waikanae Park is a cricket ground in Waikanae, Wellington, New Zealand.  The ground held its first List A match when Central Districts played Auckland in the 1993/94 Shell Cup.  The ground later held five further List A matches, the last of which came in the 2004/05 State Shield when Central Districts played Wellington. Central Districts Women used Victoria Park as a home venue in two fixtures in the 2001/02 State League.

References

External links
Waikanae Park at ESPNcricinfo
Waikanae Park at CricketArchive

Cricket grounds in New Zealand
Sports venues in the Kapiti Coast District
Waikanae